2. OG is the second and last studio album by German boy band Overground. It was released on November 8, 2004 by Cheyenne, Polydor and Zeitgeist.

Track listing

Charts

References

2004 albums
Overground (band) albums
Polydor Records albums